Nikolaos "Nikos" Chougkaz (alternate spellings: Chougaz, Hougkaz, Hougaz) (Greek: Νικόλαος "Νίκος" Χουγκάζ; born October 4, 2000 in Athens, Greece) is a Greek professional basketball player for Peristeri of the Greek Basket League, on loan from EuroLeague mainstays Panathinaikos.

Youth career
Chougkaz played three seasons of youth system basketball with the Greek club Peristeri.

College career
Chougkaz played at a fully professional level of competition in the 2018–19 season. However, he was still able to retain his personal amateur status for the NCAA DI. That was because his contract with Panionios Athens was structured so that his salary would be below the maximum limit that the NCAA allows in order for players to keep their NCAA eligibility.

Chougkaz moved to the United States, in order to play college basketball at Northwestern State University. He played with the Northwestern State Demons, during the 2019–20 season. During his Freshman season, he averaged 9.2 points, 7.2 rebounds, 1.2 assists, 1.0 steals, and 0.7 blocks per game, while shooting 40.7% overall from the field, 28.0% from three-point range, and 70.1% from the free-throw line. Ultimately, Chougkaz only played with the Demons for that one season, and he then returned to Greece, to play professionally.

Professional career
Chougaz started his career with Panionios Athens of the Greek Basket League in 2018. In his first season playing at a pro club level (2018–19), he averaged 3.4 points, 1.1 rebounds, 0.1 assists, 0.2 steals, and 0.1 blocks per game, while shooting 42.9% overall from the field, 41.2% from 2-point range, 50.0% from 3-point range, and 87.5% from the free-throw line. While playing with Panionios Athens, his contract allowed him to retain his amateur status for the NCAA. After spending the 2019–20 season with the college basketball team Northwestern State, he joined the Greek League club Ionikos Nikaias.

On November 22, 2020, Chougaz recorded career-highs in both points and rebounds, after he scored 18 points and grabbed 11 rebounds, in his team΄s win over Lavrio. On March 21, 2021, he tied the best three-point shooting record of the Greek League, after he shot 7 for 7 from three-point distance, in a win against Larisa. He finished that game with 23 points, 6 rebounds, and 2 assists, and he was later named league's MVP of the Week. He averaged 10.6 points, 6.3 rebounds, 0.8 assists, 0.9 steals, and 0.4 blocks per game, while shooting 42.9% overall from the field, 45.2% from 2-point range, 39.2% from 3-point range, and 74.7% from the free-throw line. during the Greek League's 2020–21 season.

On July 20, 2021, Chougkaz officially signed a four-year contract with Greek Basket League champions and EuroLeague mainstays Panathinaikos. He would remain on loan to Ionikos for the 2021-2022 season. In 12 league games with Ionikos, Chougkaz averaged 7.2 points and 4.2 rebounds, playing around 27 minutes per contest.

Chougkaz was recalled to Panathinaikos on February 7, 2022. On February 25, 2022, he made his EuroLeague debut, aged 21, on a game against KK Crvena zvezda.
In 13 league games with Panathinaikos, he averaged 3.8 points and 2.5 rebounds, playing around 10 minutes per contest. Additionally, he appeared in a total of 4 EuroLeague games, averaging 1 point and 1.2 rebounds, playing around 6 minutes per contest.

On February 3, 2023, after a half-season of limited playing time, Chougkaz was loaned to Peristeri, under coach Vassilis Spanoulis.

National team career

Greek junior national team
Chougkaz was a member of the junior national teams of Greece. With Greece's under-18 junior national team, he played at the 2018 FIBA Europe Under-18 Championship. He averaged 2.8 points, 1.0 rebounds, 0.2 assists, and 0.6 steals per game at the tournament. With Greece's under-19 junior national team, he played at the 2019 FIBA Under-19 World Cup. He averaged 5.7 points, 2.9 rebounds, 0.1 assists, 0.7 steals, and 0.4 blocks per game at the tournament.

Greek senior national team
Chougkaz first played with the senior Greek national team on 20 February 2021, when he played at the 2022 EuroBasket qualifiers. In his first game with the men's national team, he had 3 points and 1 rebound in Greece's 84–69 loss to Bosnia and Herzegovina. Overall, in two games played, he averaged 4.0 points, 2.0 rebounds, and 0.5 blocks per game during the qualifiers.

Personal life
Chougaz΄s mother Sonia Dafkou, was a long-time professional basketball player, having also played for Panathinaikos. His father Chris, who was born in Alexandria, Egypt, is a former professional basketball player and a coach. He has been the head coach of numerous clubs in Europe. His twin brother Robert, plays college basketball at Northwestern State University.

References

External links
Nikos Chougkaz RealGM.com Profile
Nikos Chougkaz Eurobasket.com Profile
Nikos Chougkaz DraftExpress.com Profile
Nikos Chougkaz ProBallers.com Profile
Nikos Chougkaz Greek Basket League Profile 
Nikos Chougkaz Greek Basket League Profile 

Living people
2000 births
Greek men's basketball players
Ionikos Nikaias B.C. players
Northwestern State Demons basketball players
Panionios B.C. players
Panathinaikos B.C. players
Peristeri B.C. players
Power forwards (basketball)
Basketball players from Athens